Fabrik may refer to:

 Fabrik Inc., a manufacturer of external hard drives and associated software
 Fabrik (Hamburg), an events centre in Hamburg, Germany
 Fabrik (software), a visual programming integrated development environment
 FABRIK, an inverse kinematics solver